Jan Cych (born 20 April 1944) is a Polish middle-distance runner. He competed in the men's 3000 metres steeplechase at the 1968 Summer Olympics.

References

External links
 

1944 births
Living people
Athletes (track and field) at the 1968 Summer Olympics
Polish male middle-distance runners
Polish male steeplechase runners
Olympic athletes of Poland
Place of birth missing (living people)
20th-century Polish people
21st-century Polish people